The UAAP Season 81 basketball tournaments were the University Athletic Association of the Philippines (UAAP) basketball tournaments for the 2018–19 school year.

Former NU Bulldogs athletic director Junel Baculi replaced Atty. Rebo Saguisag as commissioner for the season's basketball tournaments on August 28, 2018. Former Vietnam Basketball Association commissioner Tonichi Pujante was also appointed as assistant commissioner.

The senior men's and women's tournaments began on September 8, 2018 while the games of the juniors' division began on November 11.

The Ateneo Blue Eagles and the NU Lady Bulldogs successfully defended their championships this season. Ateneo finished first after the elimination round, followed by Adamson. UP, FEU and La Salle finished tied for third, with UP getting the #3 seed due to tiebreakers. FEU defeated La Salle in the playoff for the #4 seed, and were beaten by Ateneo in the semifinals. Adamson lost out in the semifinals again, losing to UP, who have never been in the semifinals since 1998. Qualifying to its first UAAP Finals since 1986, UP was swept by Ateneo in the latter's second consecutive (and tenth overall) UAAP title. Thirdy Ravena was named Finals MVP, after scoring a still-standing UAAP Finals record of 38 points in the title-clinching Game 2.

The NU Lady Bulldogs won all elimination round games, qualifying to the Finals outright. FEU emerged  through the stepladder playoffs that also involved UST and Adamson as NU's Finals opponent, but were still swept by the Lady Bulldogs. NU won its fifth consecutive title, all unbeaten seasons, for a still-standing league record of 80–0 in the last five tournaments.

In the Juniors' Division, the NU Bullpups and the Ateneo Blue Eaglets finished the elimination round with the top two seeds. NU eliminated the Adamson Baby Falcons, the only team that defeated them in the eliminations, while Ateneo defeated FEU Baby Tamaraws. In the rematch of last year's finals, the Bullpups defeated the defending champions, by winning all two Finals games. The Bullpups won their fourth title since 2011.

Teams
All eight member universities of the UAAP fielded teams in all three divisions.

Coaches

Coaching changes

Venues
The Mall of Asia Arena in Pasay and the Smart Araneta Coliseum in Quezon City were the primary venues for the men's tournament, and the venues for the finals series for the women's tournament. The Filoil Flying V Centre in San Juan and the Blue Eagle Gym in Quezon City were the alternate venues for the men's and women's tournament, respectively and the main venue for the women's and juniors' tournaments.

In the second round of the men's tournament, two game days were scheduled at the Ynares Center in Antipolo.

Men's tournament

Elimination round

Team standings

Match-up results

Scores
Results on top and to the right of the dashes are for first-round games; those to the bottom and to the left of it are second-round games.

Fourth–seed playoff 
The Tamaraws and the Green Archers last met in the fourth seed playoff in 2012 in which La Salle won. The winner faces Ateneo in the semifinals while the loser gets eliminated.

Prior to the game both teams were having ups and downs into this match-up, after losing their first four games in the second round FEU manage to win their last three games to salvage their season, while La Salle sitting as the #4 and #3 throughout the season lost their last two games that denied them a chance for the last twice-to-beat advantage and a slot in the semifinals. In the first quarter, the Tamaraws were leading already by seven points, 17–10, towards the end of that period but the Green Archers countered it with an 11–2 run to take the lead by two points, 21–19. An Axel Iñigo buzzer beater 3-point shot regained the lead for FEU as they took a single-point lead. In the second quarter, both teams exchanged blows but La Salle took matters the most to lead by two points at halftime, 38–36. In the third quarter, FEU  pounced La Salle into a corner with a five-point lead but La Salle cut the deficit by three points, 54–51, heading into the final period. In the fourth quarter, the Tamaraws were trying to pull away while the Green Archers were trying to catch up. La Salle eventually crept up tying the game and regained the lead. FEU's Prince Orizu fouled out of the game as Barkley Eboña returned to the game despite suffering from cramps earlier. La Salle took advantage of it as they led by four points towards the last two minutes of the game. However, FEU went within striking distance going toe to toe against La Salle cutting the lead by a single basket. The Green Archers swung back the lead by four, 70–66. with less than a minute remaining in the game. In an inbound play, Jasper Parker passed the ball to Ken Tuffin and converted his jumper and cut La Salle's lead by two points with less than 40 seconds remaining. Off a timeout, La Salle inbounded a pass but turned the ball over as it paved the way for FEU to steal the game from them. After the timeout, FEU had the possession with Parker holding the ball as he found a wide open Arvin Tolentino who shot a three-pointer to take the lead for FEU, 71–70, with 3.1 seconds remaining. In La Salle's final possession, Aljun Melecio found an open Leonard Santillan to win the game for them but eventually he was blocked by three FEU defenders winning the Tamaraws the game. Arvin Tolentino, who had a season plagued with controversy, led the scoring for FEU with 15 points with three three-pointers made including the last shot that sealed the game for them, while Barkley Eboña, one of the unsung heroes for FEU, finished with a double-double of 12 points and 16 rebounds.

Bracket
*Game went into overtime.

Semifinals
Ateneo and Adamson had the twice to beat advantage. Ateneo qualified for its fifth consecutive Final Four appearance, and the second consecutive year where they are the first seed. Adamson, the second seed, was in its third consecutive appearance, and improved on last year's third seed. Third seed UP qualified for its first Final Four appearance in 21 years, last appearing in the playoffs in 1997. FEU advanced to the Final Four in its sixth consecutive season, the longest active streak.

Ateneo vs. FEU 
Ateneo had the twice-to-beat advantage. Ateneo has faced FEU in the semifinals in three consecutive seasons where the Blue Eagles won the last two series.

Ateneo started off with all cylinders on fire highlighted by two consecutive dunks by Thirdy Ravena to start the game on an 8–0 start despite FEU finally converted their shots with two consecutive three-pointers to cut the deficit by four points. However, the Tamaraws never had a chance to catch up against the Blue Eagles as they were blown out by as many as 31 points towards the end of the 3rd quarter. Ateneo outscored FEU in every quarter except in the last period as they didn't needed to use their twice to beat advantage after going wire to wire in the past few seasons. They finally marched on to their third consecutive Finals appearance and twelfth overall in the Final Four era.

Adamson vs. UP 
Adamson had the twice-to-beat advantage. The Falcons and the Fighting Maroons were in their first playoff match-up against each other. The winner of the series would be the seventh team to qualify in the Finals in the Final Four era.

In the first game of the series, both teams exchanged leads in the 1st half with UP taking the 1st quarter while Adamson taking the 2nd to nudge by a point at halftime. But the Fighting Maroons outscored the Falcons in the 3rd quarter 26–14 to take an 11-point lead heading into the 4th quarter. Adamson refused to lose as they countered them with a 26-11 scoring run to lead by 4 but UP countered it back with a 6–0 run of their own to take a 71-69 heading into regulation. A costly foul by UP sends Sean Manganti to the free throw line as he converted both of his free throws. UP called a timeout with 3.7 seconds remaining in the game to strategize the play as Juan Gómez de Liaño from the inbound found an open Bright Akhuetie to seal the game for them as they forced a rubber match.

In the second game, the Fighting Maroons kept their guns ablaze as they led by ten points in the first quarter and nine points at half time. Their lead later ballooned already by 16 points, 60–44, but the Falcons countered it with their own scoring with a 23–4 run to take the lead at the end of the third quarter, 67–64. Both teams exchanged leads towards regulation as UP led by three points with less than ten seconds remaining, 78–75. Jerom Lastimosa shot a three-point shot to tie the game once again at 78-all with UP in ball possession. Paul Desiderio missed a shot as the game went into overtime. In the extra period Adamson took a six-point lead already, 84–78, with 2:39 remaining in overtime, but UP scored 6 straight points to tie once again at 84-all with 58.2 seconds remaining. Adamson's top gunner Jerrick Ahanmisi went down with cramps after a contested layup against Bright Akhuetie was waved off by the referee, instead calling it a foul on JD Tungcab on the floor. Ahanmisi missed the remainder of the game. Two free throws were awarded to Adamson because they were already in the penalty. Jonathan Espeleta came in to take the shots in place of Jerrick Ahanmisi but split his freethrows to lead by a point. A three-point shot by Paul Desiderio swang back the lead to UP 87–85 with forty seconds remaining but a foul by UP sent another Adamson player back into the free throw line and tied for one last time at 87-all. Desiderio's jumper over Sean Manganti however put UP back on top 89–87 with 6.6 seconds remaining with Adamson calling its last time out. The ball was given to Jerom Lastimosa to win the game but he missed a three-point shot that would give Adamson the victory, as UP won the game and entered the Finals for the first time since 1986.

Finals
The best-of-three finals began on December 1. It would be the first Finals match-up between the two teams. This is the first time that UP has made it to the finals since 1986, while defending champions Ateneo were in its third consecutive Finals appearance. The winner qualified for the 2018 PCCL National Collegiate Championship.

 Finals Most Valuable Player:

Awards

 Most Valuable Player: 
 Rookie of the Year: 
 Mythical Team:

Sponsored awards
 Manulife Playmaker of the Season: 
 Milo Nutri-up Up Your Galing Performance Award: 
 Appeton Most Improved Player of the Season: 
 PSBankable Player of the Season:

Players of the Week

Statistics

Players' statistical points

Season player highs

Game player highs

Game team highs

Season team highs

Broadcast notes
ABS-CBN Sports is the official broadcaster of the UAAP Season 81 Men's Basketball games.

Women's tournament

Elimination round

Team standings

Match-up results

Scores
Results on top and to the right of the dashes are for first-round games; those to the bottom and to the left of it are second-round games.

Fourth–seed playoff 
This is a one-game playoff. The winner advances to the 1st round of the stepladder; the loser is eliminated.

Second–seed playoff
The winner advances to the 2nd round of the stepladder with the twice to beat advantage; the loser is relegated to the 1st round of the stepladder.

Bracket

Stepladder semifinals

Stepladder round 1
This is a one-game playoff. Adamson last faced UST in the semifinals in 2011 in which the Lady Falcons won.

Stepladder round 2
FEU holds the twice to beat advantage. The Lady Tamaraws last faced the Tigresses in the first round of last year's stepladder semifinals where UST won.

Finals
The NU Lady Bulldogs advance to the best-of-three finals by winning all 14 elimination round games. The Lady Bulldogs have not lost for 78 consecutive games, and have swept the elimination round for the past five seasons. This is a rematch of the 2014 Finals where the Lady Bulldogs won, and was the last Finals appearance of the Lady Tamaraws.

 Finals Most Valuable Player:

Awards

 Most Valuable Player: 
 Rookie of the Year: 
 Mythical Team:

Player of the Week

Juniors' tournament
The juniors' tournament began on November 11, 2018 at the Blue Eagle Gym, Quezon City.

Elimination round

Team standings

Match-up results

Scores
Results on top and to the right of the dashes are for first-round games; those to the bottom and to the left of it are second-round games.

Bracket

Semifinals

NU vs. Adamson
The NSNU Bullpups (#1 seed) have a twice-to-beat advantage.

Ateneo vs. FEU
The Ateneo Blue Eaglets (#2 seed) have a twice-to-beat advantage.

Finals 
This is a best-of-three playoff.

Finals Most Valuable Player:

Awards

 Most Valuable Player: 
 Mythical Five:
Six players were named to the Mythical team for the first time in UAAP history.

Overall Championship points

Seniors' division 

In case of a tie, the team with the higher position in any tournament is ranked higher. If both are still tied, they are listed by alphabetical order.

How rankings are determined:
 Ranks 5th to 8th determined by elimination round standings.
 Loser of the #1 vs #4 semifinal match-up is ranked 4th
 If stepladder: Loser of stepladder semifinals round 1 is ranked 4th
 Loser of the #2 vs #3 semifinal match-up is ranked 3rd
 If stepladder: Loser of stepladder semifinals round 2 is ranked 3rd
 Loser of the finals is ranked 2nd
 Champion is ranked 1st

See also 
 NCAA Season 94 basketball tournaments

References

Basket
UAAP basketball tournaments
2018–19 in Philippine college basketball